Phragmomphalina is a genus of sea snails, marine gastropod mollusks in the family Solariellidae, the top snails.

Species
 Phragmomphalina alabida (B. A. Marshall, 1979)
 Phragmomphalina diadema (B. A. Marshall, 1999)
 Phragmomphalina tenuiseptum (B. A. Marshall, 1999)
 Phragmomphalina vilvensi Herbert & Williams, 2020

References

 Williams, S.T., Kano, Y., Warén, A. & Herbert, D.G. (2020). Marrying molecules and morphology: first steps towards a reevaluation of solariellid genera (Gastropoda: Trochoidea) in the light of molecular phylogenetic studies. Journal of Molluscan Studies 86 (1): 1–26

External links
 Williams, S.T., Kano, Y., Warén, A. & Herbert, D.G. (2020). Marrying molecules and morphology: first steps towards a reevaluation of solariellid genera (Gastropoda: Trochoidea) in the light of molecular phylogenetic studies. Journal of Molluscan Studies 86 (1): 1–26

 
Solariellidae
Gastropod genera